This list of accidents and incidents on airliners in the United States summarizes airline accidents that occurred within the territories claimed by the United States, with information on airline company with flight number, date, and cause.

This list is a subset of the list of accidents and incidents involving airliners by location.

It is also available grouped
 by year as List of accidents and incidents involving commercial aircraft
 by airline as List of accidents and incidents involving airliners by airline
 by fatalities as List of fatal accidents and incidents involving commercial aircraft in the United States

Alabama 
 Atlantic Southeast Airlines Flight 2254 collided with a Civil Air Patrol Cessna 172 over Gadsden, on April 9, 1990. Both individuals on board the Cessna were killed, while Flight 2254 was able to land safely at Northeast Alabama Regional Airport.
 GP Express Flight 861 crashed in Anniston, on June 8, 1992, after the crew lost spatial and situational awareness while attempting to land. Two passengers and the captain were killed.
 L'Express Airlines Flight 508 crashed in Birmingham, while attempting to land at Birmingham Municipal Airport during a severe thunderstorm on July 10, 1991, killing 13 people. It remains the deadliest commercial aviation accident in Alabama history.
 Pennsylvania Central Airlines Flight 105 crashed  while attempting to land at Birmingham Municipal Airport on January 6, 1946. The three pilots were all killed.
UPS Flight 1354 crashes short of Birmingham–Shuttlesworth International Airport due to pilot error and pilot fatigue. Both crew members are killed.

Alaska
 ACE Air Cargo Flight 51 crashes into Muklung Hills killing both crew members.
 Alaska Airlines Flight 1866 crashed into a mountain in the Chilkat Range near Juneau, on September 4, 1971, killing all 111 on board. It was the first fatal jet airliner crash for Alaska Airlines, and the worst plane crash in the history of the United States until June 24, 1975.
 Japan Air Lines Flight 46E experienced an engine detachment on No. 2 while climbing over Alaska, on March 31, 1993. The pilots did lose some control but soon made a successful emergency landing at Anchorage International Airport, with all three pilots surviving.
 KLM Flight 867 lost all four engines after flying through volcanic ash, but managed to land safely and without loss of life at Anchorage International Airport on December 15, 1989.
 Northwest Airlines Flight 85 experienced a severe rudder hardover event that forced it to divert to Anchorage on October 9, 2002. As a result of the incident, an airworthiness directive was issued to prevent further such events.
 Northwest Airlines Flight 4422 crashed into Mount Sanford killing all 30 on board on March 12, 1948. The wreckage was lost for nearly fifty years until being located in 1997. The exact cause of the accident was never determined.
 Northwest Orient Airlines Flight 293 was a Military Air Transport Service charter flight carrying 101 servicemen and their families that crashed into the sea off the Alaska coast on June 3, 1963. The cause of the accident was never determined, and no bodies were ever recovered.
 Pan Am Flight 923 crashed into the side of Tamgas mountain near Annette Island on October 26, 1947. 18 people died, making it the deadliest crash in Alaska at the time.
 Pan Am Flight 799 stalls after take-off and crashes due to an incorrect flap setting. All 3 crew members die.
 PenAir Flight 3296 runs off the end of the runway at Unalaska Airport. One passenger is killed by a propeller blade.
 Reeve Aleutian Airways Flight 8 suffers a propeller detachment and loses control. The plane lands safely at Anchorage International Airport.
 Wien Air Alaska Flight 99 crashed into Sevuokuk Mountain while on approach to Gambell, through heavy fog on August 30, 1975. 10 people on board were killed on impact and in the subsequent fire.
 Wien Consolidated Airlines Flight 55 crashed into Pedro Bay, killing all 39 on board on December 2, 1968, after encountering extreme air turbulence and suffering structural failure. The accident is the third-worst accident involving a Fairchild F-27.

Arizona
 Grand Canyon Airlines Flight 6 collided with a Bell 206 helicopter over Grand Canyon National Park on June 18, 1986. All 25 passengers and crew on board the two aircraft were killed.
 Southwest Airlines Flight 812 suffered rapid depressurization while in flight on April 1, 2011, due to a manufacturing error dating back to the Boeing 737's construction.
 United Airlines Flight 718 and TWA Flight 2 collide over the Grand Canyon on June 30, 1956, killing all 128 aboard both aircraft. A Civil Aeronautics Board investigation determined that the aircraft had been flying in each other's blind spots and did not see each other prior to impact.

Arkansas
American Airlines Flight 1 On Tuesday, January 14, 1936, the flight crashed into a swamp near Goodwin, disintegrating on impact and killing all 17 people on board. "With great difficulty the bodies of the victims were brought out of the marsh where their bodies were found scattered among fragments of the shattered plane. At the time, it was the worst civil plane crash on U.S. soil. As of 2016, it remains the deadliest crash in Arkansas state history. * 
American Airlines Flight 1420 overran the runway while attempting to land at Little Rock National Airport on June 1, 1999. The pilots decided to land though heavy winds and wind shear exceeded the safety limits for the aircraft, and in their rush to land they made a number of critical errors that led to the flight's crash. The captain and ten passengers were killed on impact.
 Texas International Airlines Flight 655 crashed into Black Fork Mountain on September 27, 1973, killing all 8 passengers and 3 crewmembers. The pilots had descended below the minimum altitude for the area while attempting to circumnavigate a thunderstorm.

California

 75 passengers on board Aerolíneas Argentinas Flight 386 fell ill with cholera after eating contaminated shrimp on February 20, 1992, between Lima, Peru and Los Angeles. One person died.
 Aeroméxico Flight 498 collided with a Piper Archer on August 31, 1986. All 64 people on both aircraft were killed. The stricken aircraft plummeted into Cerritos, California, killing an additional 15 on the ground.
 Air Canada Flight 759 accidentally lines up with a taxiway and nearly collides with taxiing planes at San Francisco International Airport. The plane lands safely.
The two pilots, three cabin crew members, and 83 passengers on board and a total of 88 were killed, and the aircraft was destroyed.
 American Airlines Flight 28 collided with a US Army Air Corps B-34 bomber over Chino Canyon on October 23, 1942, after the army pilot's reckless flying severed the airliner's tail. All twelve on board Flight 28 were killed; both army pilots survived.
 An Arrow Air DC-3 crashes flies into terrain on approach to Sacramento, killing all 9 on board.
 Asiana Airlines Flight 214 crashed upon landing at San Francisco International Airport on July 6, 2013. Of the 307 people aboard, three were killed and 181 injured.
 BCPA Flight 304 crashed during its initial approach towards San Francisco International Airport on October 29, 1953, killing all 19 people on board, including the American pianist William Kapell
 China Airlines Flight 006 suffers an in-flight upset and dives 30,000 feet before recovering. It lands safely at San Francisco International Airport.
 Emery Worldwide Flight 17 loses control after take-off and crashes into automobile salvage yard due to faulty maintenance. All 3 crew members die.
 Flying Tiger Line Flight 282 crashed near the top of Sweeney Ridge in San Bruno on December 24, 1964.

 Golden West Airlines Flight 261 collided in mid-air with a Cessna 150 (N11421) near Whittier, California, on January 9, 1975.
 Hawthorne Nevada Airlines Flight 708 crashed into the tallest mountain in the contiguous United States, Mount Whitney, near Lone Pine, on February 18, 1969, killing all 35 passengers and crew on board.
 Hughes Airwest Flight 706 collided with a fighter jet on June 6, 1971, and crashed into the San Gabriel Mountains near Duarte, California, killing all 49 people aboard.
 Japan Airlines Flight 2 accidentally landed in San Francisco Bay while attempting to land at San Francisco International Airport during heavy fog on November 22, 1968.
 JetBlue Airways Flight 292 executed an emergency landing on September 21, 2005, in Los Angeles International Airport after the nose wheels of the landing gear jammed in an abnormal position. No one was injured.
 Omega Aerial Refueling Services Flight 70 veers off the runway on May 18, 2011, following an engine separation. Everyone survives.
 Pacific Air Lines Flight 773 crashed near San Ramon, California, on May 7, 1964, after a passenger shot the flight crew and killed himself, causing the plane to crash and killing all 44 on board.
 Pan Am Flight 7 crashed into the Pacific Ocean while en route to Hawaii on November 8, 1957, killing all 44 on board. The reason for the crash was never determined.

 Pan Am Flight 845 struck the Approach Light Structure (ALS) navigational aids at the end of San Francisco International Airport's runway 01R on takeoff for Tokyo on July 30, 1971.
 Pan Am Flight 1104 crashed into a mountain near Boonville, California, on January 21, 1943, killing all 19 on board, including Rear-Admiral Robert Henry English, Commander of the U.S. Pacific Submarine Fleet.

 PSA Flight 182 collided with a Cessna over San Diego on September 25, 1978, killing all 144 people on both aircraft. It is the deadliest aircraft disaster in California history, the first fatal Pacific Southwest Airlines incident, and, at the time, the deadliest aircraft incident in the United States.
 PSA Flight 1771 crashed near Cayucos, California, on December 7, 1987, after being hijacked by a disgruntled former airline employee, killing all 43 on board.
 Southwest Airlines Flight 1455 overran the runway upon landing at Burbank-Glendale-Pasadena Airport on March 5, 2000.
 Standard Air Lines Flight 897R crashes on approach to Burbank Airport, killing 35.
 USAir Flight 1493 collided while attempting to land with a plane attempting to take off on the same runway in Los Angeles, California, on February 1, 1991. All 12 people aboard the smaller plane were killed, as well as an eventual total of 23 out of the 89 passengers on the Boeing 737.
 United Airlines Trip 34 crashed into Rice Canyon, California, on December 27, 1936, killing all 12 passengers and crew.
 United Airlines Flight 266 crashed into Santa Monica Bay four minutes after takeoff on January 18, 1969, killing all 38 on board.
All 50 persons on board perished.
 United Airlines Flight 863 nearly flies into San Bruno Mountain after take-off from San Francisco International Airport. The plane lands safely.
 Western Air Express Flight 7 crashed into Pinetos Peak northeast of San Fernando on January 12, 1937, killing five, including adventurer and documentary filmmaker Martin Johnson of Martin and Osa Johnson fame.

 TWA Flight 8 crashes into Yosemite National Park while attempting to divert to Fresno during severe weather on March 1, 1938.

Colorado
 Chartered Avjet Gulfstream III business jet crashed on March 29, 2001, into terrain while on instrument approach to Aspen-Pitkin County Airport, Aspen, Colorado, killing all 18 on board.
 Continental Airlines Flight 1404 crashed while taking off from Denver on December 20, 2008, resulting in 2 critical injuries and 36 non-critical injuries. The aircraft was written off.
 Continental Airlines Flight 1713 crashed on take-off in a snowstorm from the Denver, Colorado, Stapleton International Airport on November 1, 1987. The crash resulted in the deaths of 28 of the aircraft's occupants while 54 survived. The airplane was destined for Boise, Idaho.
 Key Lime Air Flight 970 collides with a Cirrus SR22. Both planes land safely.
 United Airlines Flight 328 suffers an uncontained engine failure and lands safely at Denver International Airport.
 United Airlines Flight 585 crashed while attempting to land at Colorado Springs Airport on March 3, 1991
 United Airlines Flight 610 crashed near Denver on June 30, 1951, killing all 50 people on board.

 United Airlines Flight 629 exploded over Longmont, Colorado, on November 1, 1955, due to a bomb placed on the aircraft by John Gilbert Graham as part of an attempt to collect insurance money.

 United Airlines Flight 663 was the location of a "minor international incident" on April 7, 2010, involving a Qatari diplomat on the leg of a United Airlines flight from Ronald Reagan Washington National Airport to Denver International Airport. The diplomat prompted a mid-air terrorism alert after smoking in the airplane lavatory, which led the Qatari government to recall him two days later.
 United Airlines Flight 696 is hijacked by Clay Thomas. 95 minutes after landing at Denver International Airport, Thomas surrenders.
 United Airlines Flight 859 crashed during landing at Stapleton International Airport, Denver, Colorado, on July 11, 1961. The aircraft slammed into several airport vehicles, including construction equipment, and caught fire, killing 18 (including one on the ground) and injuring 104 from a total of 122 people on board.
 31 people are killed in the Wichita State University football team plane crash. The cause is attributed to pilot error.

Connecticut

 An Allegheny Airlines Flight 485 passenger airliner crashed through three vacant beach cottages and into a swampy field as it attempted to land at Tweed New Haven Airport on June 7, 1971.  28 passengers and 2 crew members were killed. Only 2 passengers and the first officer survived. The Convair 580 was a two-engine propjet with a seating capacity of 50. The NTSB determined that the probable cause of the accident was pilot error, because the captain disregarded the prescribed minimum descent altitude in adverse weather conditions.
 American Airlines Flight 1572 crashed while attempting to land at Bradley International Airport due to incorrect altimeter setting, on November 12, 1995.
  Pilgrim Airlines  Flight 203 went down in the Long Island Sound near Waterford, Connecticut on February 10, 1970, about two hours after it had departed from Trumbull Airport en route to JFK Airport. After the flight was held in the New York area for an extended period, it diverted to Tweed New Haven Airport, where it attempted and missed an instrument landing approach. The aircraft was ditched in the Sound when it attempted to return to Trumbull Airport. All 5 people aboard the aircraft perished. The NTSB determined that the probable cause of the accident was fuel exhaustion and pilot error.
A  Rockwell International Turbo Commander 690B turboprop plane killed four people—including two children on the ground—when it slammed into a neighborhood in East Haven, Connecticut, on August 11, 2013.  The aircraft came in inverted and nose down at a 60- to 70-degree angle when it crashed into the side of a home about a half-mile from Tweed New Haven Airport. The NTSB  determined that the probable cause of this accident was pilot error. His failure to maintain airspeed while banking aggressively in and out of clouds for landing in gusty tailwind conditions resulted in an aerodynamic stall and uncontrolled descent.

District of Columbia
 Air Florida Flight 90 crashed in Potomac River in 1982 after hitting the 14th Street Bridge in Washington, D.C. shortly after takeoff from Washington National Airport in Arlington County, Virginia, during icy conditions. The captain declined to de-ice the aircraft after waiting on the runway for nearly an hour and did not turn on the engine deicers, causing a fatal buildup of ice on the wings and insufficient engine thrust. Four passengers and a flight attendant survived.
 American Airlines Flight 444 was a Boeing 727 that was attacked by the Unabomber on November 15, 1979. The bomb in the cargo hold failed to explode, but the incident led the FBI to begin investigating the Unabomber.
 Eastern Air Lines Flight 537 collided with a Lockheed P-38 Lightning on November 1, 1949, killing all but the P-38 pilot.

Florida

 Airborne Transport airliner NC16002 disappeared the night of December 28, 1948, near the end of a scheduled flight from San Juan, Puerto Rico to Miami, Florida. The aircraft was never found, and the case remains unsolved.

 America West Flight 556 was ordered back to terminal after pilots were suspected of being drunk on July 1, 2002.
 Chalk's Ocean Airways Flight 101 crashed off Miami Beach, Florida, due to structural failure, December 19, 2005.
 Cubana de Aviación Flight 493 collided with a US Navy Beechcraft SNB-1 Kansan on April 25, 1951, killing all on both aircraft.

 Delta Air Lines Flight 1288 experienced an uncontained, catastrophic turbine engine failure during takeoff at Pensacola on July 6, 1996. Debris from the front compressor hub of the engine penetrated the fuselage, killing two passengers.
 Eastern Air Lines Flight 401 crashed into the Everglades on December 29, 1972, while attempting to land in Miami, Florida.
 Eastern Air Lines Flight 855 lost three engines but managed to land safely at Miami International Airport on May 5, 1980.
 Fine Air Flight 101 crashed on takeoff from Miami International Airport on August 7, 1997.
 National Airlines Flight 16 crashed into the water after overshooting the runway in Lakeland, Florida, on October 5, 1945. Two passengers drowned.
Three passengers drowned while attempting to exit the aircraft.
 Northwest Airlines Flight 5 suffered an in-flight engine failure due to improper maintenance procedures on January 4, 1990. The engine separated from the wing and landed in a field near Madison, Florida.
 Northwest Orient Airlines Flight 705 broke up in midair and crashed into the Everglades shortly after taking off in a severe thunderstorm on February 12, 1963.
 PBA Flight 1039 crashed upon takeoff from Jacksonville International Airport on December 6, 1984, killing all 13 passengers and crew.
 Southern Airways Flight 49 was successfully hijacked by three passengers and forced to fly to Cuba on November 10, 1972. Cuba returned the airplane, crew, passengers, and ransom money to the US and sentenced the hijackers to prison.
 ValuJet Flight 592 crashed in the Florida Everglades on May 11, 1996, when a fire started in a cargo hold during takeoff. All 110 on board were killed instantly.
The Bramlage Plane crashed on June 7, 2012, near Lake Wales, Fla. The crash probably was caused by the inexperience of the pilot, Ronald Bramlage of Junction City, Kan., who was killed with his wife and four children.
RED Air Flight 203 caught fire at Miami International Airport after landing due to landing gear collapsing causing a runway excursion. There were three minor injuries among the 140 passengers and crew on board.

Georgia
 Atlantic Southeast Airlines Flight 529 crashed near Carrollton, Georgia, on August 21, 1995, due to mechanical failure, and the wreckage subsequently ignited before an evacuation could be completed. Nine of the 29 passengers and crew on board eventually died due to injuries suffered in the accident.
 Atlantic Southeast Airlines Flight 2311 crashed near Brunswick, Georgia, on April 5, 1991, killing all 23 passengers and crew, including former U.S. Senator John Tower and astronaut Sonny Carter.
Lehigh Acres Development Inc. Flight 701 crashed near Atlanta, Georgia, on May 30, 1970, killing one passenger and five people in a car.  Thirty other passengers were injured when the twin-engine, propeller-driven plane, a Martin 404, crashed on the Moreland Avenue bridge over I-285, after just departing moments before from the Peachtree-DeKalb Airport, several miles across town, headed for Fort Myers, Florida.
 Eastern Air Lines Flight 21 crashed while preparing to land at Candler Field on February 26, 1941. Eight of the 16 on board were killed. Among the injured was Eastern Air Lines president and World War I hero Eddie Rickenbacker.

 Southern Airways Flight 242 executed a forced landing on a highway in New Hope, Paulding County, Georgia, after suffering hail damage and losing thrust on both engines in a severe thunderstorm on April 4, 1977. 63 out of 85 passengers and crew on board were killed, as well as 9 more on the ground.

Hawaii

 The 1955 Hawaii R6D-1 crash occurs in which a Douglas R6D-1 Liftmaster crashes into the Waianae Range in Oahu, killing all 66 people on board. This accident remains the deadliest air disaster in Hawaii.
 Aloha Airlines Flight 243 suffered explosive decompression when the passenger roof blew off during an inter-island flight on April 28, 1988. A flight attendant was killed, and the plane landed safely at Kahului Airport.
 Pan Am Flight 830 made an emergency landing in Honolulu after a terrorist bomb exploded, killing a single passenger on August 11, 1982.
 Pan Am Flight 6 is forced to make an emergency water landing in the Pacific Ocean northeast of Hawaii after two of its four engines failed on October 16, 1956. There were only a few minor injuries and no fatalities.

 United Airlines Flight 811 experienced a cargo door failure in flight on Friday, February 24, 1989, after its stopover at Honolulu International Airport, Hawaii. The resulting explosive decompression blew out several rows of seats, killing 9 passengers.
 Transair Flight 810 ditches off the coast of Oahu after a double engine failure. Both crew survive with injuries.
 Hawaiian Airlines Flight 35 experienced severe turbulence, everyone onboard survived with 36 people injured, 11 of which had serious injuries.

Illinois

 American Airlines Flight 191 lost control and crashed immediately after take-off at O'Hare International Airport, Chicago on May 25, 1979. killing all 271 occupants and 2 people on the ground. Its No. 1 engine had been severed on the runway. It was the deadliest plane crash in U.S. history until the September 11 attacks in 2001.
 American Airlines Flight 444 was attacked by the Unabomber on November 15, 1979, near Chicago Illinois. The bomb planted in the cargo hold malfunctioned, but 12 passengers had to be treated for smoke inhalation.
 Northwest Orient Airlines Flight 706 crashed during take-off from O'Hare International Airport on September 17, 1961, killing all 37 on board. The co-pilot's control of the aileron boost unit had been disconnected during maintenance.

 Southwest Airlines Flight 1248 slid off the runway while landing in a snowstorm at Chicago Midway Airport on December 8, 2005. The aircraft crashed into automobile traffic, killing a 6-year-old boy in a car.
 TWA Flight 529 crashed on takeoff from Chicago Midway International Airport on September 1, 1961, killing all 78 people on board. A bolt had fallen out of the elevator system, resulting in an abrupt pitch up and stall.
 United Airlines Flight 389 crashed into Lake Michigan near Lake Forest, Illinois, on August 16, 1965, killing all 30 on board.

 United Airlines Flight 553 struck trees and houses in Chicago before crashing into a house after an aborted landing at Chicago Midway International Airport on December 8, 1972. Illinois Congressman George W. Collins and the wife of Watergate conspirator E. Howard Hunt, Dorothy Hunt, were killed in the crash.

Indiana
 Allegheny Airlines Flight 853 crashed southeast of Indianapolis, Indiana on September 9, 1969, due to collision with a private plane, killing all 83 people aboard both aircraft.
 American Eagle Flight 4184 crashed near Roselawn, Indiana, due to icing on October 31, 1994, killing all 68 on board.
 Northwest Orient Airlines Flight 710 crashed near Cannelton, Indiana, on March 17, 1960, killing all 57 passengers and 6 crewmembers.

 United Airlines tail number NC13304 was destroyed by a bomb on October 10, 1933, near Chesterton, Indiana, in what is thought to be the first proven act of air sabotage in the history of commercial aviation.

Iowa
 Continental Airlines Flight 11 was a Boeing 707 aircraft which exploded in the vicinity of Centerville, Iowa, while en route from O'Hare Airport, Chicago, Illinois, to Kansas City, Missouri, on May 22, 1962.
 United Airlines Flight 232  crash-landed on July 19, 1989, at Sioux Gateway Airport in Sioux City after explosion of the No. 2 engine destroyed all three hydraulic systems. The pilots were hailed as heroes for landing the plane only using the throttles.
 A DC-3 owned by and carrying the Minneapolis Lakers NBA team made an emergency landing in a cornfield near Carroll, Iowa, on January 17, 1960. The DC-3 had lost all electrical power. Future NBA Hall of Fame player Elgin Baylor was on board.

Kansas
 A Transcontinental & Western Air Fokker F-10 crashed near Bazaar, Kansas, on March 31, 1931, killing all eight aboard, including University of Notre Dame football coach Knute Rockne.

Kentucky
 Air Canada Flight 797 - Emergency landed at Cincinnati/Northern Kentucky International Airport on June 2, 1983, after a fire started in the aft washroom. By the time the plane landed, the fire had already consumed much of the aircraft. While the evacuation was in progress, the fire erupted in a flashover which killed 23 of the 46 people on board.
 Air Tahoma Flight 185 ran out of fuel and crashed as it approached the runway at Cincinnati/Northern Kentucky International Airport on August 13, 2004. One person, the first officer, was killed.
 On July 28, 1943, American Airlines Flight 63 lost control due to severe turbulence and violent downdrafts and crashed near Trammel, Kentucky, killing 20 out of 22 people on board.

 American Airlines Flight 383 crashed on approach to Cincinnati/Northern Kentucky International Airport on November 8, 1965, and only 3 passengers and 1 flight attendant survived.

 Comair Flight 5191 crashed while attempting to take off from Blue Grass Airport on August 27, 2006, killing all 47 passengers and 2 out of 3 crewmembers.
 Comair Flight 444 crashed shortly after takeoff from Cincinnati/Northern Kentucky International Airport on October 8, 1979, killing all on board.
 The 1955 Cincinnati mid-air collision between a TWA Martin 2-0-2 and a Douglas DC-2 on January 12, 1955, killing all on board both aircraft.
 TWA Flight 128 struck trees on final approach and crashed  short of the runway at Cincinnati/Northern Kentucky International Airport on November 20, 1967.
 TWA Flight 159 rolled off the runway after the captain aborted a takeoff at Cincinnati/Northern Kentucky International Airport on November 6, 1967. The aircraft crashed and caught fire. One passenger died later of injuries sustained during the crash.

Louisiana
 Eastern Air Lines Flight 304 crashed into Lake Pontchartrain on February 25, 1964, killing all 58 on board.
 Delta Air Lines Flight 9877 crashes in New Orleans on March 30, 1967, during a training flight, killing all 6 people on board and 13 people on the ground.
 National Airlines Flight 967 disappeared over the Gulf of Mexico near New Orleans on November 16, 1959, with 42 passengers and crew on board. Several bodies and some scattered debris were recovered, though the main section of wreckage was never found. The cause was presumed to be a bombing, though investigators were unable to prove it.
 Pan Am Flight 759 - Crashed in Kenner, Louisiana, July 9, 1982, shortly after takeoff from New Orleans.
 TACA Flight 110 made a successful deadstick landing on a grass levee at NASA's Michoud Assembly Facility in eastern New Orleans after losing thrust in both engines on May 24, 1988. There were no casualties or serious injuries.

Maine

 Bar Harbor Airlines Flight 1808 crashed short of the runway at Lewiston Airport  on August 25, 1985, killing all on board, including 13-year-old Samantha Smith, the "Goodwill Ambassador" to the Soviet Union.
 Downeast Flight 46 crashed during approach to Knox County Regional Airport near Rockland, Maine on May 30, 1979, killing both crew and 15 of the 16 passengers on board.
 TWA Flight 277 crashed into Fort Mountain in Baxter State Park on June 20, 1944. Heavy wind and rain had blown the C-54 Skymaster off-course, and the pilot suffered a bout of spatial disorientation and did not realize his position in relation to the mountain. The pilot and all six passengers were killed.

Maryland
 Capital Airlines Flight 75 crashed in Chase, Maryland, on May 12, 1959, due to a weather-induced loss of control. All perished.
 The rudder on board MetroJet Flight 2710 malfunctioned, causing the jet to roll violently on February 23, 1999. The crew was able to regain control and landed safely at Baltimore-Washington International Airport.
 Pan Am Flight 214 crashed near Elkton, Maryland, on December 8, 1963, after being struck by lightning and having a fuel tank on the wing  that was empty but had flammable fumes explode.
 United Airlines Flight 297 crashed near Columbia, Maryland, on November 23, 1962, after a bird strike.

Massachusetts
 Air New England Flight 248 crashed on approach to Barnstable Municipal Airport on June 17, 1979. The cause was determined to be pilot fatigue. One crew member was killed.
 On June 9, 2005, Aer Lingus Flight 132, an Airbus A330 "St. Maeve" and US Airways Flight 1170, a Boeing 737 almost collide while both were taking off on intersecting runways at Logan International Airport, Boston.
 Colgan Air Flight 9446 crashed into the water off of Yarmouth, Massachusetts, shortly after takeoff on August 26, 2003. Improper maintenance and pilot error led to a loss of control in-flight. The pilot and co-pilot, the only people on board, perished.
 Delta Air Lines Flight 723 crashed while landing at Logan International Airport on July 31, 1973, killing all 89 on board.
 Eastern Air Lines Flight 375 crashed on takeoff from Logan International Airport on October 4, 1960. 10 survived.
The First Officer was presumed to have nose-dived the plane and turned off the engines before it crashed.
 World Airways Flight 30 overshot the runway due to icy conditions on January 23, 1982, killing 2 passengers.

Michigan

 Capital Airlines Flight 67 crashed on final approach to MBS Airport during a severe snowstorm on April 6, 1958.
  Comair Flight 3272 was a Comair flight on January 9, 1997, that crashed on approach to Detroit Metropolitan Wayne County Airport, near Detroit.
 Northwest Airlines Flight 253 was the target of the attempted al-Qaida "Christmas Day bombing" on December 25, 2009. Nigerian-born Umar Farouk Abdulmutallab attempted to detonate plastic explosives concealed in his underwear, but was stopped by other passengers.
 Northwest Airlines Flight 255 crashed after takeoff from Detroit Metropolitan Wayne County Airport on August 16, 1987, because the pilots had forgotten to set the flaps to takeoff position. 154 people on board, plus two on the ground, were killed. The only surviving passenger was a four-year-old girl.
 Northwest Airlines Flight 299 collided with Northwest Airlines Flight 1482 on an active runway at Detroit Metropolitan Wayne County Airport in heavy fog on December 3, 1990. Seven passengers and one crewperson from Flight 1482 were killed. There were no injuries on board Flight 299.
 Northwest Orient Airlines Flight 2501 disappeared on the night of June 23, 1950, over Benton Harbor on Lake Michigan. The plane was never found.
 Trans-Canada Air Lines Flight 304 diverted to Windsor, Ontario after the blade of the propeller broke off and sliced through a section of the cabin, killing one passenger and injuring four passengers and one flight attendant on July 9, 1956, while flying over Flat Rock, Michigan.
 TWA Flight 841 made an emergency landing at Detroit, Michigan, after losing control and barrel-rolling at supersonic speeds on April 4, 1979. No fatalities occurred among the 82 passengers and seven crew members, though eight passengers reported minor injuries relating to high G forces. The exact cause of the accident is disputed.

Minnesota 
 Northwest Airlink Flight 5719 crashed on approach to Hibbing on December 1, 1993, after striking trees following a controlled excessive descent into the airport on its night approach during ILS conditions. The crash claimed all 16 passengers and the two flight crew aboard and is the worst aviation accident in Minnesota history.
 On March 7, 1950, Northwest Orient Airlines Flight 307 hit a flagpole on approach to Minneapolis-Saint Paul International Airport and crashed into a house.

Mississippi
 A Convair CV-240 that was carrying members of the rock band Lynyrd Skynyrd crashed in Gillsburg, Mississippi on October 20, 1977, after running out of fuel. The crash claimed the lives of six out of the twenty people on board the aircraft, including four passengers and both crew members.
 A United States Marine Corps Lockheed Martin KC-130 crashed in Leflore County, Mississippi on July 10, 2017, killing all sixteen people on board, including seven passengers and nine crew members. This makes it the deadliest aviation accident in Mississippi history.

Missouri
 Continental Airlines Flight 11, a Boeing 707, near Unionville, Missouri, due to bomb exploded by a passenger on May 22, 1962.

 Continental Airlines Flight 12 overran the runway at Kansas City Downtown Airport on July 1, 1965.

 Corporate Airlines Flight 5966 crashed on approach to Kirksville Airport on October 19, 2004, killing thirteen.
 Ozark Air Lines Flight 809 crashed on approach to Lambert-St. Louis International Airport on July 23, 1973, after flying through a microburst generated by a severe thunderstorm; 38 of the 44 people on board perished.
 Pinnacle Airlines Flight 3701 crashed on October 14, 2004, near Jefferson City, Missouri, after engine flameout and subsequent pilot error.
 TWA Flight 427 struck a Cessna 441 while on a takeoff roll at Lambert-St. Louis International Airport on November 22, 1994. The two people on board the Cessna were killed instantly.
 1966 NASA T-38 Crash -  a NASA-owned Northrop T-38 Talon was flying into Lambert Field when it hit the roof of the McDonnell Aircraft building where their Gemini 9 spacecraft was being assembled and crashed nearby on February 28, 1966. The two people on board, Elliot See and Charles Bassett, were killed.

Montana

This was the first fatal crash for Northwest Airlines.

Nebraska

 Braniff Flight 250 broke up midair and crashed near Falls City, Nebraska, on August 6, 1966, after flying into an active squall line. All 42 on board killed.

Nevada
The airplane immediately exploded, killing all 29 on board. This was the first and only fatal crash for the airline.
Of the 71 passengers and crew, the only survivor was a 17-year-old passenger who was thrown clear of the plane.
 TWA Flight 3 crashed into Mount Potosi 23 minutes after takeoff from Las Vegas on January 16, 1942. All 22 on board are killed, including movie star Carole Lombard.

 United Airlines Flight 736, collided with a US Air Force F-100 Super Sabre fighter on a training mission near Las Vegas on April 21, 1958. All 47 aboard the airliner and both F-100 crew members are killed.

New Hampshire
Northeast Airlines Flight 946 crashed near Etna, New Hampshire, on October 25, 1968, killing 32 passengers and crew. The NTSB report suggests that the pilots misjudged their altitude position during approach due to a lack of navigational aids on the aircraft and near the airport.

New Jersey 
The cause of the crash was never determined. This was the first fatal crash of a Convair 240.

 Continental Airlines Flight 1883 accidentally landed on a taxiway instead of a runway at Newark Liberty International Airport, on October 28, 2006.
 FedEx Flight 14 crashed during landing at Newark International Airport on July 31, 1997. The pilot was unable to slow down the descent of the aircraft, and it bounced and rolled on the runway, eventually coming to rest on its back and catching fire.

New Mexico 

 TWA Flight 260 deviated from its prescribed flight path and crashed into the Sandia Mountains on February 19, 1955, for reasons unknown.

New York

 American Airlines Flight 1 crashed immediately after takeoff from Idlewild Airport (now JFK airport), New York City on March 1, 1962.

 American Airlines Flight 11 was hijacked by Al Qaeda operatives after takeoff from Boston during the September 11, 2001, terrorist attacks. The aircraft was subsequently crashed into the North Tower of the World Trade Center in Manhattan, New York City.
 American Airlines Flight 320 crashed in the East River on approach to LaGuardia Airport, New York City on February 3, 1959. 65 of the 73 people on board perished.

 American Airlines Flight 587 crashed in Belle Harbor, Queens, New York City after takeoff from John F. Kennedy International Airport on November 12, 2001. Everyone on board was killed along with five people on the ground.
 American Airlines Flight 723 crashed in Colonie, New York, while attempting to land at Albany Airport. All 28 people on board perished.
 American Airlines Flight 1502, a Boeing 707-123 Flagship Oklahoma, crashed at Montauk, New York, United States, after an unexplained loss of control on January 28, 1961, while on a training flight, six killed.
 Avianca Flight 52 crashed at Cove Neck, Long Island, after running out of fuel on January 25, 1990.
 Colgan Air Flight 3407 crashed six miles from the runway at Buffalo Niagara International Airport on February 12, 2009.
 Continental Charters Flight 44-2, crashed into a ridge near Napoli, New York, while en route to Buffalo, New York, on December 29, 1951.
 Eastern Air Lines Flight 66 crashed after striking the runway lights at Kennedy airport on June 24, 1975.
 Eastern Air Lines Flight 512 crashed during go-round after failing to land at Idlewild Airport in the fog on November 30, 1962. 25 people (4 crew, 21 passengers) perished.

 Eastern Air Lines Flight 663 crashed into the Atlantic Ocean, approximately seven miles south of Jones Beach State Park on Long Island, after takeoff from Kennedy airport when forced to evade inbound Pan Am Flight 212 on February 8, 1965.

 Mohawk Airlines Flight 121 crashed during takeoff from Rochester-Monroe airport on July 2, 1963, killing 7 people and injuring 36.

 Mohawk Airlines Flight 405 crashed into a house on March 3, 1972, on final approach to Albany International Airport, killing 17 people.
 Mohawk Airlines Flight 411 crashed into Pilot Knob on November 19, 1969, killing all 14 passengers and crew on board.
 Northeast Airlines Flight 823 crashed on Rikers Island, New York City, during takeoff from LaGuardia Airport on February 1, 1957.

 Northwest Airlines Flight 6231 crashed near Stony Point, New York, on December 1, 1974, due to pilot error. All 3 crew on board were killed.
 The 1965 Carmel mid-air collision between TWA Flight 42 and Eastern Air Lines Flight 853 over Carmel, New York, on December 4, 1965.

 TWA Flight 266 (inbound to Idlewild Airport) and United Airlines Flight 826 (inbound to LaGuardia Airport) collided over Miller Field, Staten Island, New York City on December 16, 1960. The TWA aircraft crashed at the site while the United aircraft continued flying for 8 miles until it crashed in the Park Slope section of Brooklyn.

 TWA Flight 800 exploded in mid-air and crashed into the Atlantic Ocean near East Moriches, New York, on July 17, 1996, killing all 230 people on board.
 TWA Flight 843 crashed and burst into flames after an aborted takeoff from John F. Kennedy International Airport on July 30, 1992. All 292 people on board were safely evacuated.

 United Airlines Flight 175 was hijacked after takeoff from Boston during the September 11, 2001, terrorist attacks. The aircraft was subsequently crashed into the South Tower of the World Trade Center in Manhattan, New York, City.
 United Airlines Flight 521 failed to get airborne during takeoff on May 29, 1947. The aircraft overran the end of the runway, ripped through an airport fence, barreled through traffic on the Grand Central Parkway, and then slammed into an embankment before ultimately plunging into a pond and exploding.

 United Airlines Flight 826 suffered a mid-air collision over New York City in 1960.
 US Airways Flight 1549 was a commercial flight from LaGuardia Airport (LGA) in New York City to Charlotte/Douglas International Airport (CLT) in Charlotte, North Carolina, that on January 15, 2009, made an emergency water landing in the Hudson River about six minutes after takeoff.
 USAir Flight 405 crashed during takeoff from LaGuardia Airport on March 22, 1992.
 USAir Flight 5050 crashed during an aborted takeoff from LaGuardia Airport on September 20, 1989.

North Carolina
 Air Midwest Flight 5481 crashed into an airport hangar and burst into flames 37 seconds after leaving Charlotte/Douglas International Airport, killing all 21 on board on January 8, 2003.
 Eastern Air Lines Flight 212 crashed while attempting to land in thick fog at Douglas Municipal Airport on September 11, 1974, killing 71 on board.
 National Airlines Flight 2511 exploded over Bolivia, North Carolina, on January 6, 1960, when a passenger detonated dynamite in a suicide attempt.

 Piedmont Airlines Flight 22 collided with a Cessna 310 over Hendersonville, North Carolina, on July 19, 1967, killing all on board both aircraft.
 Piedmont Airlines Flight 467 overran the runway after touchdown at Charlotte/Douglas International Airport on October 25, 1986. There were no fatalities.
 US Airways Flight 1016 crashed while attempting to land during a severe thunderstorm at Charlotte/Douglas International Airport on July 2, 1994. Strong wind shear and a microburst caused the pilots to lose control of the aircraft; 37 people were killed and 20 survived.

Ohio
 United Express Flight 6291 crashed on approach to Port Columbus International Airport, Ohio on January 7, 1994, killing five of eight people on board. The cause of the crash was attributed to pilot error.
 Cal Poly football team plane crash - October 29, 1960

 TWA Flight 553 collided in midair with a Beechcraft Baron on March 9, 1967, over Urbana, Ohio. All people on both aircraft were killed.

Oregon
 United Airlines Flight 173 ran out of fuel and crashed while attempting to land near Portland, Oregon, on December 28, 1978. 10 of 189 people on board perished.
 West Coast Airlines Flight 720 crashed after takeoff from Klamath Falls, Oregon, killing all 4 occupants.
This was the first commercial loss of a Douglas DC-9.

Pennsylvania
 Allegheny Airlines Flight 371 crashed on approach to Williamsport Regional Airport on December 1, 1959, killing 25 of 26 on board.
 Allegheny Airlines Flight 736 a Convair 580, crashed on approach to Bradford, Pennsylvania, killing 20 of the 47 people on board.
 Commonwealth Commuter Flight 317 clipped the last tower of landing lights on final approach into the Johnstown–Cambria County Airport in Johnstown, PA before slamming into an embankment on January 6, 1974.  Twelve of seventeen people on board perished.
 Mohawk Airlines Flight 40 lost control and crashed over Blossburg, Pennsylvania, on June 23, 1967, killing all 34 people on board. It was the deadliest disaster in the airline's history.
 Southwest Airlines Flight 1380 suffers an uncontained engine failure, causing a passenger to get partially sucked out from a window and later dies. The plane safely lands at Philadelphia International Airport.
TWA Flight 1, a Douglas DC-2, crashed into Cheat Mountain, near Uniontown, Pennsylvania, approximately 10:20 a.m. Eastern Standard Time April 7, 1936, killing 12 of the 14 passengers and crew aboard.
 TWA Flight 400 crashed during takeoff from Greater Pittsburgh International Airport on April 1, 1956. Twenty-two of 36 people aboard were killed.

 TWA Flight 513 crashed near Reading on July 11, 1946, while on a training flight. TWA subsequently grounded its Constellation fleet for 30 days.

 United Airlines Flight 93 was hijacked after takeoff from Newark, New Jersey, on September 11, 2001. Passengers fought  the hijackers after learning of the incidents at the World Trade Center and the hijackers' plans to use the aircraft for terrorism; their battle ended when the plane crashed into a field in Somerset County (''See also: September 11 Terrorist Attacks.)
 United Airlines Flight 624 crashed on June 17, 1948, outside of Aristes, Pennsylvania, killing all 4 crew and 39 passengers aboard.

 USAir Flight 427 nosedived into the ground on its landing approach when the rudder on the Boeing 737-300 malfunctioned near Pittsburgh on September 8, 1994. All 132 passengers and crew were killed on impact. This is the third-highest death toll of any accident involving the Boeing 737-300.

Rhode Island

US Airways Express Flight 3758 airplane slid off runway while landing at  T.F. Green Airport on December 16, 2007. The flight, carrying 31 passengers and 3 crew members from Philadelphia, slid off the runway after landing shortly before 5 p.m. No injuries were reported and assumed the incident was related to the weather.

South Carolina 
 Eastern Airlines Flight 45 collided with a US Army Air Force A-26 Invader bomber over northeastern South Carolina on July 12, 1945. One civilian, and two military personnel died.

South Dakota

 Ozark Air Lines Flight 650 struck a snow plow while landing at Sioux Falls Regional Airport during a snowstorm on December 20, 1983. The driver of the snow plow was the only casualty.

Tennessee

 American Airlines Flight 2 crashed into the Mississippi River on February 10, 1944, killing all 24 on board. The cause of the crash remains unknown.
 American Airlines Flight 63 crashed after ice formed on the wings and propeller near Centerville, Tennessee, on October 15, 1943.

 Delta Air Lines Flight 516 crashed short of the runway while attempting to land at Chattanooga Metropolitan Airport on November 27, 1973. The cause was attributed to pilot error.
 Federal Express Flight 705 experienced an attempted hijacking for the purpose of a suicide attack on April 7, 1994. Despite serious injuries, the crew was able to make an emergency landing at Memphis International Airport.
 United Airlines Flight 823 crashed near Parrottsville, Tennessee, after an uncontrollable fire broke out in the main cabin, killing all 39 passengers and crew on July 9, 1964.

Texas
 American Airlines Flight 157 crashed during final approach to Love Field in Dallas, Texas, after the pilot lost control when an engine failed on November 29, 1949. 26 passengers and 2 flight attendants died.
 American Airlines Flight 910 collided with a privately owned Temco Swift on June 28, 1952, while on approach to Dallas Love Field. Both people on board the Swift were killed and the aircraft was destroyed; Flight 910 landed safely with no injuries or fatalities.
 Atlas Air Flight 3591 nosedives into Trinity Bay as a result of spatial disorientation. All 3 crew members are killed.
 Braniff Flight 38 was hijacked on January 12, 1972, while en route to Dallas Love Field. All passengers and crew were able to escape safely in Dallas, and the hijacker was arrested.
 Braniff Flight 352 broke up in mid air and crashed near Dawson, Texas, after flying into a severe thunderstorm on May 3, 1968. All 85 on board were killed.
 Braniff Flight 542 disintegrated in mid-air near Buffalo, Texas, on September 29, 1959. All 34 passengers and crew were killed.
 Continental Express Flight 2574 crashed on descent in Eagle Lake, Texas, near Houston, on September 11, 1991.
 Delta Air Lines Flight 191 crashed upon landing in Dallas/Fort Worth International Airport in Dallas/Fort Worth on August 2, 1985, due to a powerful weather event known as a microburst.
 Delta Air Lines Flight 1141 crashed after takeoff from Dallas-Fort Worth Airport in Dallas/Fort Worth on August 31, 1988. The NTSB determined that the flight crew had failed to deploy the plane's flaps prior to takeoff.
 Delta Air Lines Flight 9570 crashed at the Greater Southwest International Airport in Fort Worth, Texas, during a training flight on May 30, 1972.
 Empire Airlines Flight 8284 crashes on final approach to Lubbock Preston Smith International Airport. Both crew members survive.
 Evergreen International Airlines Flight 17 suffers a cargo door opening and loses control killing both crew members.
 JetBlue Flight 191 diverted to Rick Husband Amarillo International Airport on March 27, 2012, after its captain suffered a severe mental breakdown while flying from New York to Las Vegas and had to be restrained by passengers while the copilot and a deadheading captain took over.

Utah

 United Air Lines Boeing 247 crashes into a Utah canyon in bad weather, February 23, 1934, killing all eight on board.
 United Airlines Flight 227 crashed short of the runway while attempting a scheduled landing at Salt Lake City International Airport, Salt Lake City, Utah, on November 11, 1965.

 Skywest Airlines Flight 1834, January 15, 1987, mid-air collision with small private plane, Salt Lake City, Utah

Virginia
 American Airlines Flight 77 was hijacked after takeoff from Dulles on September 11, 2001. Terrorists crashed the aircraft into The Pentagon in Arlington County, Virginia.
 Capital Airlines Flight 20 crashed into a farm in Charles City County, Virginia, on January 18, 1960, killing all 50 people on board.
 Eastwind Airlines Flight 517 suffered an in-flight rudder malfunction on June 9, 1996. The pilot was able to regain control of the Boeing 737-200, and the aircraft landed safely with only a single injury at Richmond International Airport.
 Piedmont Airlines Flight 349 crashed into Bucks Elbow Mountain near Crozet, Virginia, on October 30, 1959, killing all three crewmembers and 23 of 24 passengers.
 TWA Flight 514 crashed into Mount Weather during descent to Dulles International, on December 1, 1974.

Washington
 
 Northwest Airlines Flight 305 was hijacked by a man using the alias "D. B. Cooper" on November 24, 1971. Cooper ransomed the passengers for $200,000 and four parachutes, and then later jumped from the plane over Washington state. Cooper was never seen again, and the case remains the only unsolved US aircraft hijacking.
 Northwest Orient Airlines Flight 2 ditched into Puget Sound just off the Seattle waterfront shortly after takeoff from the Seattle-Tacoma International Airport on April 2, 1956. All of those aboard survived the ditching and escaped the aircraft before it sank, but four passengers and one flight attendant subsequently died.
United Express Flight 2415 crashed on approach to Pasco Airport.
2018 Horizon Air Q400 incident crashed after being stolen by an airline employee.

West Virginia

 Pennsylvania Central Airlines Flight 410 crashed into the Blue Ridge Mountains near Charles Town, West Virginia, on June 13, 1947, due to pilot error. All 50 people on board were killed, making it the second deadliest accident in US commercial air travel at the time.
 Southern Airways Flight 932 crashed near Huntington-Tri-State/Milton Airport after 7:30 p.m. on November 14, 1970, carrying the Marshall University Marshall Thundering Herd football squad, killing all on board.
 Southwest Airlines Flight 2294 made an emergency landing at Yeager Airport in Charleston, West Virginia, after structural damage led to rapid depressurization of the passenger cabin on July 13, 2009. There were no fatalities.

Wisconsin

 Air Wisconsin Flight 671 and North Central Airlines Flight 290 collided over Lake Winnebago on June 29, 1972. All 13 people aboard both aircraft were killed, though the NTSB was unable to determine why the pilots were unable to detect each other and took no evasive action.
 Midwest Express Airlines Flight 105, a DC-9 (31 Series), crashed just after takeoff from General Mitchell Airport, Milwaukee, Wisconsin, while on a scheduled flight to Atlanta-Hartsfield International on September 6, 1985, after suffering engine failure. All 31 passengers and crew on board died during impact or in the post-crash fire.
 Northwest Airlines Flight 421 The airliner crashed near the Wisconsin-Minnesota border near Winona, Minnesota, on a routine scheduled flight from Chicago to St. Paul, Minnesota, after flying into a severe thunderstorm on August 29, 1948. It was the first loss of a Martin 2-0-2 aircraft, the worst disaster involving a Martin 2-0-2 to date, and with 37 fatalities, still ranks as the worst air crash in Wisconsin history.

Wyoming

 United Airlines Trip 4 crashed near Silver Crown, Wyoming, on October 7, 1935. The Bureau of Air Commerce determined the cause was pilot error. All 12 aboard perished.
 United Airlines Flight 409 crashed into Medicine Bow Peak, near Centennial, Wyoming, on October 6, 1955, killing all 66 people on board. At the time, this was the worst crash in U.S. commercial aviation history.
 Western Airlines Flight 470 overran the runway at Casper/Natrona County International Airport on March 31, 1975. All 99 people on board the aircraft survived.

U.S. Territories

American Samoa

 Pan Am Flight 806 crashed on approach to Pago Pago International Airport on January 30, 1974, killing 97 people on board.
 The Samoan Clipper, one of ten Pan American Airways Sikorsky S-42 flying boats, exploded over Pago Pago, American Samoa on January 11, 1938.

Guam (United States) 

 Korean Air Flight 801 crashed on August 6, 1997, on approach to Antonio B. Won Pat International Airport, Guam. 229 of the 254 people aboard the Boeing 747 perished in the crash. It is the deadliest crash in Guam to date, and the 9th deadliest crash involving a 747.

Puerto Rico

 American Eagle Flight 5452 crashed while landing in San Juan, Puerto Rico on May 8, 1987, killing both pilots and destroying the aircraft. All four passengers survived.
 American Eagle Flight 5456 crashed into a swamp near Mayagüez, Puerto Rico during heavy rain on June 7, 1992. All five people on board were killed.
 Pan Am Flight 526A ditched in rough seas after mechanical failure caused its engines to fail on April 11, 1952. Panicking passengers refused to leave the sinking aircraft; 52 passengers drowned and the remaining 17 passengers and crew were rescued by the US Coast Guard. After this accident, airlines began performing pre-flight safety demonstrations for over-water flights.
 Prinair Flight 191 crashed while attempting to land at Mercedita Airport on June 24, 1972. Five people died in the accident.
 Vieques Air Link Flight 901A crashed into the Atlantic Ocean after taking off from Vieques, Puerto Rico on August 2, 1984. The pilot and all eight passengers died. The NTSB determined that the pilot was not qualified to be the pilot-in-command of a commuter aircraft, one of the fuel tanks had been contaminated with water, the aircraft was over loaded, and no life vests were found in the wreckage.

U.S. Virgin Islands

 ALM Flight 980 ditched near St. Croix on May 2, 1970, after the aircraft ran out of fuel while making several attempts at landing in St. Maarten due to pilot error. 23 people died; 40 survived.
 American Airlines Flight 625 crashed at St. Thomas, U.S. Virgin Islands on April 27, 1976, due to pilot error. 37 people on board perished.

Deadliest incidents
This is a list of all airliner accidents and incidents in the United States and its territories that have resulted in 100 or more fatalities. They are listed by death toll and include any ground fatalities and injuries, as well as any survivors on board the aircraft.

A more extensive and globally inclusive list of deadliest aircraft accidents and incidents is also available.

 Was previously the deadliest airliner accident or incident.

Notes

References

External links
 Department of Transportation, Special Collections - archived accident reports of the Civil Aeronautics Board.
 Recent aviation accidents investigated by the NTSB (National Transportation Safety Board).
 Older aviation accidents investigated by the NTSB.
 Aviation studies conducted by the NTSB.
 Aviation statistical Reports, by the NTSB.

 
 
Airliners in the United States
Accidents and incidents in the United States
Accidents, Airliners
Aviation